Atalaya District is a district (distrito) of Veraguas Province in Panama. The population according to the 2000 census was 8,916; the latest official estimate (for 2019) ia 11,321. The district covers a total area of 156 km². The capital lies at the town of Atalaya.

Administrative divisions
Atalaya District is divided administratively into the following corregimientos:

Jesús Nazareno de Atalaya
El Barrito
La Montañuela
San Antonio
La Carrillo

References

Districts of Panama
Veraguas Province